The Extended Speech Assessment Methods Phonetic Alphabet (X-SAMPA) is a variant of SAMPA developed in 1995 by John C. Wells, professor of phonetics at University College London. It is designed to unify the individual language SAMPA alphabets, and extend SAMPA to cover the entire range of characters in the 1993 version of International Phonetic Alphabet (IPA). The result is a SAMPA-inspired remapping of the IPA into 7-bit ASCII.

SAMPA was devised as a hack to work around the inability of text encodings to represent IPA symbols. Later, as Unicode support for IPA symbols became more widespread, the necessity for a separate, computer-readable system for representing the IPA in ASCII decreased. However, X-SAMPA is still useful as the basis for an input method for true IPA.

Summary

Notes 
 The IPA symbols that are ordinary lower case letters have the same value in X-SAMPA as they do in the IPA.
 X-SAMPA uses backslashes as modifying suffixes to create new symbols. For example, O is a distinct sound from O\, to which it bears no relation. Such use of the backslash character can be a problem, since many programs interpret it as an escape character for the character following it. For example, such X-SAMPA symbols do not work in EMU, so  backslashes must be replaced with some other symbol (e.g., an asterisk: '*') when adding phonemic transcription to an EMU speech database. The backslash has no fixed meaning.
 X-SAMPA diacritics follow the symbols they modify.  Except for ~ for nasalization, = for syllabicity, and ` for retroflexion and rhotacization, diacritics are joined to the character with the underscore character _.
 The underscore character is also used to encode the IPA tiebar: k_p codes for /k͡p/.
 The numbers _1 to _6 are reserved diacritics as shorthand for language-specific tone numbers.
 The IETF language tags registry has assigned  as the subtag for text transcribed in X-SAMPA.

Lower-case symbols

Capital symbols

Other symbols

Diacritics

Charts

Consonants 

 Asterisks (*) mark sounds that do not have X-SAMPA symbols. Daggers (†) mark IPA symbols that have recently been added to Unicode. Since April 2008, the latter is the case of the labiodental flap, symbolized by a right-hook v in the IPA: . A dedicated symbol for the labiodental flap does not yet exist in X-SAMPA.

Vowels

See also 
 Comparison of ASCII encodings of the International Phonetic Alphabet
 List of phonetics topics
 SAMPA, a language-specific predecessor of X-SAMPA
 SAMPA chart for English

References

External links 
 Computer-coding the IPA: A proposed extension of SAMPA
 X-SAMPA to IPA to CXS converter
 Web-based translator for X-SAMPA documents. Produces Unicode text, XML text, PostScript, PDF, or LaTeX TIPA.
 Z-SAMPA, a backward-compatible extension of X-SAMPA sometimes used for conlangs

SAMPA
1995 in computing
Writing systems introduced in the 1990s
University College London